The Boys' Doubles tournament of the 2012 Asian Junior Badminton Championships was held from July 3–7 in Gimcheon, South Korea. The defending champion of the last edition were Lin Chia-yu and Huang Po-jui from Chinese Taipei. The bronze medals goes to the first seeded Lee Chun Hei / Ng Ka Long of Hong Kong and unseeded players Alfian Eko Prasetya / Kevin Sanjaya Sukamuljo of Indonesia, after defeated in the semifinals round. Another Indonesian pair Arya Maulana Aldiartama / Edi Subaktiar emerged as the champion after beat Wang Chi-lin / Wu Hsiao-lin of Chinese Taipei in the finals with the score 17–21, 22–20, 21–10.

Seeded

  Lee Chun Hei / Ng Ka Long (semi-final)
  Hafiz Faizal / Putra Eka Rhoma (third round)
  Calvin Ong Jia Hong / Tan Wee Gieen (second round)
  Arya Maulana Aldiartama / Edi Subaktiar (champion)
  Darren Isaac Devadass / Tai An Khang (quarter-final)
  Hemanagendra Babu / Gopi Raju Geovani (second round)
  Muhammad Aliff Nurizwan / Muhamad Akmal Zakaria (second round)
  Choi Sol-gyu / Park Se-woong (quarter-final)

Draw

Finals

Top Half

Section 1

Section 2

Section 3

Section 4

Bottom Half

Section 5

Section 6

Section 7

Section 8

References

External links 
Main Draw

2012 Asian Junior Badminton Championships